Jean-Baptiste Hus (Paris, June 1736 – Paris, 1805) was a French ballet dancer and ballet master who used the pseudonym Hus-Malo.  He was the son of François Hus and Françoise-Nicole Gravillon, the brother of the future actress Mlle Hus, and a member of the large Hus family, an 18th-century dynasty of dancers and actors.  He was a student of Louis Dupré, Gaetan Vestris and Jean-Georges Noverre. He married the ballet dancer Elisabeth Bayard, also known as Mademoiselle Bibi, and adopted her son Pierre-Louis Stapleton as his own, who he helped build a career as a dancer.

Jean-Baptise Hus worked as a ballet master at La Monnaie starting from 1759.

Children
 Pierre-Louis Stapleton, born on 17 June 1758 and adopted by Jean-Baptiste Hus.
 Albert-Francois-Joseph, born and baptised in Brussels on 29 May 1762.
 Jean-Pierre, born and baptised on 19 October 1766.
 Madeleine, baptised at Lyon on 16 April 1770.
 Pierre-François, baptised on 19 November 1774.

References

External links
 Jean-Baptiste Hus at César

1736 births
1805 deaths
18th-century French ballet dancers
French choreographers
Ballet choreographers
French ballet masters
Troupe of the Comédie-Française
French male ballet dancers